Tatjana Đorđević (born March 3, 1985, in Belgrade, Serbia, SFR Yugoslavia) is a young Serbian, Rock female singer.

Career
Surrounded with music throughout her childhood, Tatjana Djordjevic began singing very young. At age 13, she won a competition called "Kids are singing Hits" singing "My Heart Will Go On" by Celine Dion.

In 2000, Tatjana won second prize in competition "First voice of Yugoslavia" with song "Zajdi zajdi". With the same song she was second in 2001 at "First voice of Serbia". In 2002, she participated in the popular kids' musical show "Bajone Express". She won the award  Hit of the Week and soon Hit of October. She also won Hit of the Year against the other winners of monthly hits.

In 2003, Tatjana formed her first band "Zabranjena zona" and competed at Rock Invasion of Belgrade's highschools. Tatjana won first prize and best vocal performance, and the band come second. In the finals they played Tracy's Flaw by Skunk Anansie.

In 2003 and 2004, She entered "Idol" and made her way into the finals. After the show, she went on Tour with the other finalists.

After the tour in 2005. Tatjana began working with Mirko and Snezana Vukomanovic, who wrote her song "Ko je kriv". With that song Tatjana competed in "Beovizija" and Evrop(j)esma in Montenegro. (Beovizija 05), (Evrop(j)esma 05)

From year 2006. she is lead singer in Belgrade rock band "Strip" (Strip). In 2006. she was first shown to the public as Strip's singer in music video "Djuka". After that, Tatjana began work on her first studio album and Strip's second called "Psihomehanicar", from who were released two singles "Psihomehanicar" and "Stiklom u celo”

In 2009, Tatjana "lent" her voice for the first Serbian animated movie called Technotise Edit & I for the character of Sanja.

She sang at Exit festival in 2006 and 2008 with her band Strip, and many other festivals.

Albums
Psihomehanicar – (2008)

References

External links
 News article
 Strip official web site

1985 births
Living people
Singers from Belgrade
21st-century Serbian women singers
Idols (franchise) participants
Serbian rock singers
Serbian voice actresses